Bolko III of Strzelce (also known as of Opole; ;  – 21 October 1382) was a Duke of Opole during 1356–1370 (with his brothers as co-rulers) and Duke of Strzelce from 1375 until his death.

He was the second son of Duke Bolko II of Opole by his wife Elisabeth, daughter of Duke Bernard of Świdnica.

Life
After his father's death in 1356, Bolko III and his brothers Władysław Opolczyk and Henry inherited Opole as co-rulers; however, the full government was held by the oldest brother, Władysław Opolczyk.

The independent rule of Bolko III began only around 1375, when he inherited Strzelce after the death of his uncle Albert without male issue. During his reign, he didn't play any political role.

Bolko III spent much of his time at the courts of King Charles in Prague and King Louis I in Buda. In 1355, Bolko III, with several other Silesian Dukes, went to Italy with King Charles of Bohemia, who came to Rome for his coronation as Holy Roman Emperor; ten years later, in 1365, he made a journey from Luxembourg to Avignon, and in 1377, together with King Louis I of Hungary and Władysław Opolczyk, he made a military expedition to Bełz.

Bolko III died on 21 September 1382 and was buried in the Franciscan chapel of St. Anna in Opole. Upon his death, his title passed to his four sons as co-rulers. Because his sons were minors, their guardianship was held by his uncle Władysław Opolczyk.

Marriage and issue
By 1355, Bolko III married a certain Anna (b. ca. 1340? – d. 8 April 1378), who may have been daughter of Duke Jan I of Oświęcim. They had five children:
Jan Kropidło (b. 1360/64  – d. 3 March 1421).
Bolko IV (b. 1363/67 – d. 6 May 1437).
Henry II (b. 1374 – d. 22 December 1394).
Bernard (b. 1374/78 – d. 2/4 April 1455).
Anna (b. bef. 8 April 1378 – d. 2 December 1455), Abbess of Trzebnica (1428).

Footnotes

References

Genealogical database by Herbert Stoyan
Genealogy of Dukes of Opole

|-

1330s births
1382 deaths
Year of birth uncertain

Piast dynasty
Dukes of Opole